Copiapoa hypogaea, the underground copiapoa, is a species of flowering plant in the genus Copiapoa in the cactus family (Cactaceae), native to northern Chile. It has gained the Royal Horticultural Society's Award of Garden Merit.

Subspecies
The following subspecies is currently accepted:

Copiapoa hypogaea subsp. cobrensis Doweld

References

Cactoideae
Endemic flora of Chile
Plants described in 1960